State Highway 41 (SH 41) is a  state highway on the Ute Mountain Ute lands in Montezuma County, Colorado, United States, that connects U.S. Route 160 (US 160), northeast of Teec Nos Pos, Arizona, with Utah State Route 162 SR-162 in Utah (southeast of Aneth, Utah). The highway is part of the Trail of the Ancients National Scenic Byway

Description

The roadway continues west as SR-162 towards Aneth, Montezuma Creek, and Bluff, Utah.

History
SH 41 was created in 1965-1966 on new alignment. Simultaneously, in June 1965, Utah State Route 262 was extended southeast from Montezuma Creek to meet SH 41 (this extension became SR-162 in 2004).

Major intersections

See also

 List of state highways in Colorado

References

External links

041
Transportation in Montezuma County, Colorado